Iran had four competitors at the 1968 Winter Olympics in Grenoble, France. All took part in the men's Alpine Skiing events, with the highest finish being 66th place by Lotfollah Kiashemshaki in the Downhill.

Competitors

Results by event

Skiing

Alpine

Men

References

External links
Official Olympic Report

Nations at the 1968 Winter Olympics
1968
Winter Olympics
Pahlavi Iran